Kayamkulam Kochunni was a famed highwayman based in Kayamkulam.

It may also refer to:
 Kayamkulam Kochunni (1966 film)
 Kayamkulam Kochunni (2018 film)
 Kayamkulam Kochunni, a television series aired on Surya TV

See also 
 Kaayamkulam Kochunniyude Makan
Kayamkulam Kochunniyude Makan